Jérémy Gelin (born 24 April 1997) is a French professional footballer who plays as defender for  club Amiens.

Club career
Gelin developed through the Rennes academy. He made his Ligue 1 debut on 28 October 2017 against Montpellier. He came on for Ramy Bensebaini in the 75th minute of a 1–0 away win.

On 7 July 2022, Gelin signed a two-year contract with Amiens.

International career
Gelin is a youth international for France, most notably being in the squad that won the 2016 UEFA European Under-19 Championship.

Career statistics

Honours
Rennes
Coupe de France: 2018–19

France U19
UEFA European Under-19 Championship: 2016

References

External links
 
 
 Rennes profile

1997 births
Living people
Sportspeople from Quimper
Footballers from Brittany
Association football defenders
French footballers
France youth international footballers
France under-21 international footballers
Quimper Kerfeunteun F.C. players
Stade Rennais F.C. players
Royal Antwerp F.C. players
Amiens SC players
Ligue 1 players
Ligue 2 players
Championnat National 2 players
Championnat National 3 players
Belgian Pro League players
French expatriate footballers
Expatriate footballers in Belgium
French expatriate sportspeople in Belgium